Pareiorhaphis scutula is a species of catfish in the family Loricariidae. It is native to South America, where it is known only from Brazil, with its type locality being listed as the Piracicaba River basin in the state of Minas Gerais. The environment in which most specimens of the species have been collected is a shallow creek 20 to 50 cm (7.9 to 19.7 inches) deep and approximately 5 m (16 ft) wide with a swift current, clear water, a rocky substrate, and banks covered in grass. It is known to occur alongside the species Geophagus brasiliensis, as well as members of the genera Astyanax, Neoplecostomus, and Trichomycterus. The species reaches 9.1 cm (3.6 inches) in standard length and is believed to be a facultative air-breather.

References 

Loricariidae
Fish described in 2010
Catfish of South America
Freshwater fish of Brazil